The Uganda mangabey (Lophocebus ugandae) is a species of Old World monkey found only in Uganda and in the Minziro Forest Reserve, just over the border in Tanzania. This crested mangabey was previously thought to just be a population of the grey-cheeked mangabey (L. albigena). Colin Groves upgraded the Ugandan population to the new species L. ugandae on 16 February 2007. This species is significantly smaller than the grey-cheeked mangabey, with a shorter skull and smaller face. 2008 was the most recent year in which the International Union for Conservation of Nature assessed the conservation status of L. albigena, describing it as being of least concern, and the status of L. ugandae has not been assessed separately.

Taxonomy
In 1978, Colin Groves recognized three subspecies of Lophocebus albigena, namely L. a. albigena; L. a. johnstoni; and L. a. osmani. Three decades later, in 2007, he raised these subspecies to full species rank on phylogenetic grounds, at the same time recognising that the mangabeys present in Uganda were sufficiently different from the remainder of L. albigena as to constitute a separate species, which he named L. ugandae.

Description

The Uganda mangabey is rather smaller than the grey-cheeked mangabey (L. albigena). It is less sexually dimorphic and has a smaller skull. Individuals from the east of Uganda have a yellowish-brown colour while those from the west are a slightly darker greyish-brown. The mane and breast are pale chocolate-brown and contrast more with the body colour than do the  equivalent parts of the Johnston's mangabey (Lophocebus johnstoni).

Distribution and habitat
The Uganda mangabey is known from the forests on the north and northwestern sides of Lake Victoria, including the Mabira Forest, from which it was first described, the Bujuko Forest, the Bukasa Forest, and the vicinity of Sango Bay. It also occurs near Kibaale, to the east of the Albertine Rift Valley. It occurs in both primary and secondary forests, and is an arboreal species, spending most of its time in the upper canopy, where it forages for fruits and seeds; favoured food items include the fruits of the false nutmeg and of the breadfruit, the fruits and seeds of Erythrophleum spp., the fruits of the date palm and the fruits of the oil palm.

Conservation
One of the largest populations of Uganda mangabey is in the Mabira Central Forest Reserve. This protected area is being illegally logged and parts are being converted to agricultural use. Attempts are being made to habituate several groups of mangabey to the presence of humans with a view to increasing wildlife tourism in the area as a means to discourage habitat destruction and provide an extra source of income for the local community.

References

Uganda mangabey
Primates of Africa
Endemic fauna of Uganda
Mammals of Uganda
Uganda mangabey
Taxa named by Paul Matschie
Taxobox binomials not recognized by IUCN